Theodore Leonard Irving (March 24, 1898 – March 8, 1962) was a U.S. Representative from Missouri.

Born in St. Paul, Ramsey County, Minnesota, Irving moved with his parents to a farm in North Dakota.
He attended the public schools of North Dakota.
He worked for a railroad as a boy and during the First World War.
He left the railroad to become manager of a theater in Montana.
He moved to California and was manager of a hotel.
He moved to Jackson County, Missouri, in 1934 and was employed as a construction worker and later became a representative of the American Federation of Labor.

Irving was elected as a Democrat to the Eighty-first and Eighty-second Congresses (January 3, 1949 – January 3, 1953). He was an unsuccessful candidate for reelection in 1952 to the Eighty-third Congress.
Defeated for Democratic nomination in 1954 to the Eighty-fourth Congress.
Labor organizer and later president of a labor union in Kansas City, Missouri.
He died on March 8, 1962, in Washington, D.C., while on a business trip. He was interred in Mount Moriah Cemetery in Kansas City.

Electoral history

See also
List of Jewish members of the United States Congress

References

1898 births
1962 deaths
Politicians from Saint Paul, Minnesota
American trade union leaders
Democratic Party members of the United States House of Representatives from Missouri
20th-century American politicians